Joseph Raymond "Wampy" Bell (15 September 1899 – 7 May 1963) was a New Zealand rugby union player. Primary a five eighth, Bell represented  at a provincial level. He played one match for the New Zealand national side, the All Blacks, against New South Wales at Christchurch in 1923. Of Ngāi Tahu descent, Bell played 56 games for New Zealand Māori between 1922 and 1931, and captained Southland.

Bell died in Invercargill in 1963, and was buried in the Eastern Cemetery, Invercargill.

References

1899 births
1963 deaths
Burials at Eastern Cemetery, Invercargill
Ngāi Tahu people
Rugby union players from Invercargill
People educated at Southland Boys' High School
New Zealand rugby union players
New Zealand international rugby union players
Southland rugby union players
Māori All Blacks players
Rugby union fly-halves